Duns Castle, Duns, Berwickshire is a historic house in Scotland, the oldest part of which, the massive Norman Keep or Pele Tower, supposedly dates from 1320. The castle and most of the structures on the property are designated as a scheduled ancient monument.

History
The early history of the building is virtually unknown. A keep was built on the lands granted to Thomas Randolph, 1st Earl of Moray by King Robert the Bruce in 1320. That structure may have been razed by the English in the 16th century, possibly during the Rough Wooing in 1545 when the nearby town of Duns was burned to the ground, as that the part of the building claimed to date from that time has been assessed as dating from the 15th – 16th century by architectural historians. 

The manor and its castle appear to have passed into the hands of Patrick V, Earl of March after Randolph's death in 1332. After the Battle of Halidon Hill the following year the manor was granted by King Edward III of England to Thomas de Bradestan. There were multiple changes of ownership afterwards. 

During the First Bishops' War of 1639, the castle housed General Alexander Leslie, 1st Earl of Leven. His army was quartered nearby and blocked the English from advancing into Scotland. Neither side wished to fight and negotiations began that led to the Pacification of Berwick that ended the war. In 1670 Sir James Cockburn of Cockburn bought the estate and burgh of Duns from Hume of Ayton. The manor was sold to William Hay of Drumelzier, son of John Hay, 1st Earl of Tweeddale in 1698 and it has remained in the family ever since.

The original keep is claimed to have been incorporated into the building as it was expanded into a L-shaped structure at an unknown date. It was remodeled shortly its acquisition and again in 1791–1798 by the architect John Baxter. The house was transformed into a Gothic castle, 1818–1822, by architect James Gillespie Graham. The interior woodwork was carved by the noted sculptor, Sir John Steell, during his apprenticeship.

There is a publicly accessible park and two man-made lakes, the Hen Poo and the smaller Mill Dam that form the Duns Castle nature reserve.

The castle and its outbuildings are currently available as a venue for weddings and corporate functions, with accommodation available for the guests.

Haunting
Alexander Hay, who was killed at the Battle of Waterloo, reputedly haunts the castle.

References

Bibliography
 Groome, F.H., Ordnance Gazetteer of Scotland: A Survey of Scottish Topography, Statistical, Biographical, and Historical, VI vols, Edinburgh, 1884.

External links

Duns castle

Houses completed in the 14th century
Berwickshire
Country houses in the Scottish Borders
Castles in the Scottish Borders
Peel towers in the Scottish Borders
Gothic Revival architecture in Scotland
Category A listed buildings in the Scottish Borders
Listed castles in Scotland
Inventory of Gardens and Designed Landscapes
James Gillespie Graham buildings
Reportedly haunted locations in Scotland
Clan Hay
Duns, Scottish Borders